Lukaku is a surname. Notable people with the surname include:

 Roger Lukaku (born 1967), Belgian and Congolese former footballer. He is the father of:
 Romelu Lukaku (born 1993), Belgian footballer, playing for Inter Milan since 2022
 Jordan Lukaku (born 1994), Belgian footballer, playing for SD Ponferradina since 2022